Life Beyond L.A. is the third album by Ambrosia, and their first album on Warner Bros. Records, released in 1978. It marked the departure of their progressive rock roots in favor of a more commercial jazz & soft rock sound. "How Much I Feel," "Life Beyond L.A." and "If Heaven Could Find Me" were released as singles.

The album was Ambrosia's most successful, peaking at #19 on the Billboard 200. Among the three singles, "How Much I Feel" managed to reach the Top 10, peaking at #3 on the Billboard Hot 100, becoming their second Top 40 hit.

Track listing

Personnel
Ambrosia
David Pack – guitar, lead and backing vocals, keyboards
Joe Puerta – bass, lead and backing vocals
Burleigh Drummond – drums, backing vocals, percussion, bassoon
David Cutler Lewis – keyboards, clavinet
Christopher North – keyboards, backing vocals (tracks 4 and 10)

Additional musicians
Daniel Kobialka – violin (Heart To Heart)
Marty Krystall – saxophone (Dancin' By Myself)

Production
Producer: Freddie Piro
Engineers: Stewart Whitmore, Tom Trefethen
Mixing: Alan Parsons, Tom Trefethen, Stewart Whitmore
Photography: Ed Caraeff Studio

Charts
Album

Singles

References

External links

Ambrosia (band) albums
1978 albums
Warner Records albums